Charles Victor Jacquot was a French general during World War I. He commanded the 6th Infantry Division throughout the war as well as participating across key battles of the Western Front.

Biography
Charles Jacquot was born in La Bourgonce, Vosges, on 22 September 1862.

In 1882 he entered the École spéciale militaire de Saint-Cyr. In 1893 he was made captain in the 38th Infantry Regiment. In 1910, then a lieutenant-colonel, he was given command of the Prytanée national militaire.

At the time of the entry into World War I he was colonel of the 107th Infantry Regiment and distinguished himself on several occasions such as on 22 August 1914, at Harifontaine, Belgium and 28 August when he broke off a German attack. Charles Jacquot's effectiveness was further noted during the First Battle of the Marne. On 27 October 1914, he was then promoted to brigadier general on the battlefield and the 6 November 1914, he was placed at the head of the 6th Infantry Division which he led during the Second Battle of Artois and with which he took Vimy Ridge on 27 September 1915. On 25 September 1915, in an observation post, he had been injured in the right shoulder by the same bullet that had just struck his chief of staff, but nevertheless refused to leave his post, which earned him a second summons to the army order in November 1915.

In April 1916, he commanded an army corps and on 22 June the same year, he was promoted to divisionary general. He then commanded the 35th Army Corps and took part in the Battle of the Somme from July to September. In 1917, he occupied the Chemin des Dames. On 9 June 1918, his units halt the German Courcelles-Ayancourt offensive. On 19 July 1918, he was given the Commander of the Legion of Honor. General Jacquot resumed service at the Chemin des Dames and entered Rocroi on 11 November 1918.

He was given command of the 21st Army Corps at Épinal, then, in January 1922, the 33rd Army Corps participated in the Occupation of the Rhineland. Jacquot died on 22 June 1922, at Bonn as a result of gas poisoning suffered in Verdun in 1916.

Awards
Commander of the Legion of Honor (19 July 2022)
Croix de guerre 1914–1918
1914–1918 Inter-Allied Victory medal
1914–1918 Commemorative war medal

References

Bibliography
 « Le général Jacquot », in Le Pays de France, no. 189, 30 May 1918, p. 3 
 J. J. Martin et Félix Chevrier (dir.), Nos Vosges. Livre d'or des Vosgiens, J.-J. Martin, Paris, 1947, p. 347
 Albert Ronsin, Les Vosgiens célèbres. Dictionnaire biographique illustré, Éditions Gérard Louis, Vagney, 1990, p. 202 

1862 births
1922 deaths
French military personnel of World War I
People from Vosges (department)
French generals
École Spéciale Militaire de Saint-Cyr alumni
Commandeurs of the Légion d'honneur